Frost Cliff is a steep, partly ice-covered cliff  east of Mount Steinfeld, on the south side of the divide between the upper reaches of Hull Glacier and Kirkpatrick Glacier, in Marie Byrd Land, Antarctica. It was mapped by the United States Geological Survey from surveys and U.S. Navy air photos, 1959–65, and was named by the Advisory Committee on Antarctic Names for Commander William L. Frost, U.S. Navy, Officer-in-Charge of Antarctic Support Activities at McMurdo Station, 1970.

References

Cliffs of Marie Byrd Land